Whicher may refer to:

Jack Whicher (1814–1881), one of the original members of the Detective Branch at Scotland Yard
 The protagonist of the British TV series The Suspicions of Mr Whicher, based on the police officer
Ross Whicher (1918–2002), Canadian politician
Whicher Range, Western Australia
Whicher National Park

See also
Wicher (disambiguation)
Which (disambiguation)